Germán Darío Osvaldo Rodríguez (born 25 January 1968) is an Argentinian retired footballer who played primarily as midfielder.

Club career
Rodríguez began his career at Deportivo Español, moving to Club Olimpo at the beginning of the 1990s. In the spring of 1991 he joined Polish I liga site Lech Poznań, becoming first foreign player in club's history. He made his league debut in 0–0 draw against Olimpia Poznań on 30 March 1991. Representing the club in 1990–91 season Rodríguez made 5 league appearances without any goal scored.

References

External links
 

Living people
1968 births
Argentine footballers
Association football midfielders
Argentine expatriate footballers
Deportivo Español footballers
Olimpo footballers
Lech Poznań players
Ekstraklasa players
Expatriate footballers in Poland
Argentine expatriate sportspeople in Poland
Footballers from Buenos Aires